There have been many Units with various tasks in the Royal Air Force and they are listed here. A unit is an administrative body, which can be larger or smaller than a Flight or Squadron, is given a specific mission, but does not warrant the status of being formed as a formal Flight or Squadron.

A

Aircraft training units

Aircraft units

Overseas Aircraft Despatch
Overseas Aircraft Despatch Unit, Kemble and Portreath
1, 2, 3, 4 & 5.

Overseas Aircraft Preparation
1, 2, 3 & 4.

Aircraft Preparation
1, 2, 3, 4, 5, 6, 7, 11, 12 & 13.

Other
1 Aircraft Delivery Unit
13 Aircraft Modification Unit

Airfields

Advanced Flying Units

Observers
 1 (1942-45) 
 2 (1942-45) 
 3 (1942-45) 
 4 (1943-45) 
 6 (1943-44)
 7 (1944-45) became No. 7 Air Navigation School RAF
 8 (1943-45)
 9 (1942-45) 
 10 (1942-45) became No. 10 Air Navigation School RAF.

Pilots
 2 (1942)
 3 (1942-45) became No. 3 Service Flying Training School RAF 
 5 (1942-45, 1945-46)
 6 (1942-45) became No. 6 Service Flying Training School RAF 
 7 (1942-44) became No. 7 Service Flying Training School RAF
 9 (1942-45)
 11 (1942-45)
 12 (1942-45)
 14 (1942-44)
 15 (1942-45)
 17 (1942-44)
 18 (1942-45)
 19 (1942-44)
 20 (1943-45)
 21 (1943-47) became No. 1 (Pilots) Refresher Flying Unit RAF and No. 2 (Pilots) Refresher Flying Unit RAF

Anti-aircraft units

Armament Practice and Training Units

To hone aircrew weapons skills armament practice camps and stations have been used and these are listed here.

Armament Practice Camp

Armament Practice Station

Armament Training Camp

Armament Training Station

B

Bases

Beach units

 

 No. 1 Beach Unit
 No. 2 Beach Unit
 No. 3 Beach Unit
 No. 4 Beach Unit
 No. 5 Beach Unit
 No. 6 Beach Unit
 No. 7 Beach Unit

 No. 68 Beach Unit
 No. 69 Beach Unit
 No. 70 Beach Unit
 No. 71 Beach Unit
 No. 76 Beach Unit
 No. 77 Beach Unit

Beam approach beacon system

C

Command level units

Communications

Conversion Units

The RAF have now granted all OCUs Reserve squadron status.

E

Establishments

F

Ferry units

Ferry Units
1, 2, 3, 4, 5, 6, 7, 8, 9, 10, 11, 12, 13, 14, 15 & 16.
 1 (Long-Range) & 3 (Long-Range).
 1 (Overseas).
 2 (Home) & 4 (Home).

Ferry Crew Pools

1, 2 & 3.

Ferry Pilots Pools

1, 2, 3, 7 (Service), 9 (Service).

Ferry Pools

1, 2, 3, 4, 5 & 8 (Service).

Ferry Training Units

301, 302, 303, 304, 305, 306, 307, 308, 309, 310, 311, 312 & 313.
308 Ferry Training and Test Flying Unit.
309 Ferry Training and Aircraft Despatch Unit.
313 Ferry Training and Conversion Unit.

Other Ferry Units

Ferry Crew Pool Unit.
Ferry Training and Despatch Unit.
Ferry Training Unit.
Overseas Ferry Unit.
Service Ferry Pilots Pool.

Foreign Air Arms

Burmese Volunteer Air Force (1940-42) became Communication Flight, Dum-Dum 
Central Flying School (Southern Rhodesia) (1944-45) 
Hong Kong Auxiliary Air Force (1949-51) became Royal Hong Kong Auxiliary Air Force 
Hong Kong Volunteer Defence Force (Air Component) (1939-41) 
Kenya Auxiliary Air Unit (1939-??) 
Kenya Pool (1941) became Pilot and Aircrew Pool 
Norwegian Training Base (1945) 

Polish Fighting Team ("Skalski's Circus"), attached to 145 Squadron (1943) 
Polish Training Unit (1940) became No. 18 (Polish) Operational Training Unit RAF 
Straits Settlements Volunteer Air force (1936-40) became Malayan Volunteer Air Force (1940-??)
WAAF (Polish) Holding Unit
Yugoslav Holding Unit (1944-45) 

In Rhodesia, the Rhodesian Air Unit of the Territorial Forces, active 1935-39, became the Rhodesian Air Unit, and then the Southern Rhodesian Air Force (1939-40). The SRAF was absorbed into the RAF proper in April 1940 and redesignated No. 237 (Rhodesia) Squadron RAF. Later the Rhodesian Air Training Group RAF  was created.

Maintenance Units

Operational Training Units (OTU)

OTUs were created during World War II to take the pressure off Operational squadrons, which previously would have had training Flights. Post war they became OCUs

Other Units

Numbered other units

Other units

P

Pools

Photographic Reconnaissance

Refresher Flying Units

S

Sectors

Signals Units

Training Wings

No. 1 Combat Training Wing RAF (1943-44) became No. 1 Tactical Exercise Unit RAF 

No. 2 Combat Training Wing RAF (1943) became No. 2 Tactical Exercise Unit RAF

See also

Royal Air Force

List of Royal Air Force aircraft squadrons
List of Royal Air Force aircraft independent flights
List of conversion units of the Royal Air Force
List of Royal Air Force Glider units
List of Royal Air Force Operational Training Units
List of Royal Air Force schools
List of Royal Air Force units & establishments
List of RAF squadron codes
List of RAF Regiment units
List of Battle of Britain squadrons
List of wings of the Royal Air Force
Royal Air Force roundels

Army Air Corps

List of Army Air Corps aircraft units

Fleet Air Arm

List of Fleet Air Arm aircraft squadrons
List of Fleet Air Arm groups
List of aircraft units of the Royal Navy
List of aircraft wings of the Royal Navy

Others

List of Air Training Corps squadrons
University Air Squadron
Air Experience Flight
Volunteer Gliding Squadron
United Kingdom military aircraft serial numbers
United Kingdom aircraft test serials
British military aircraft designation systems

References

Citations

Bibliography

External links
a list of current squadrons from the RAF website
a list of squadron codes

Royal Air Force aircraft squadrons, list of

Uni